Coleman State Park is a public recreation area on Little Diamond Pond in Stewartstown, New Hampshire. Activities in the state park include camping, hiking, fishing, ATV, and picnicking.

The park was created when the state purchased the 1,200-acre Camp Diamond property from the Coleman family in 1956.

The park is 1 of 10 New Hampshire state parks that are in the path of totality for the 2024 solar eclipse, with 2 minutes and 59 seconds of totality.

References

External links
Coleman State Park New Hampshire Department of Natural and Cultural Resources

State parks of New Hampshire
Parks in Coös County, New Hampshire
Protected areas established in 1956
1956 establishments in New Hampshire